Pterolophia viridegrisea is a species of beetle in the family Cerambycidae. It was described by Stephan von Breuning in 1938. It is known from Sumatra, Borneo and Java.

References

viridegrisea
Beetles described in 1938